Orthaga picta is a species of snout moth in the genus Orthaga. It was described by William Warren in 1895. It is found in Australia, including Queensland.

References

Moths described in 1895
Epipaschiinae
Endemic fauna of Australia